The United States Navy's Center for Information Warfare Training (CIWT) is one of the learning centers of Naval Education and Training Command, headquartered on Naval Air Station Pensacola Corry Station in Escambia County, Florida. It is responsible for the development of education and training policies for over 22,000 members of the Information Warfare Corps in the fields of cryptology and intelligence, along with the cyber realms of information operations and technology, and computer systems and networks. The Center also oversees Language, Regional Expertise and Culture. 

The Center administers about 200 courses across the globe to an average annual student count of 22,000 with a staff of nearly 1,300 military, civilian and contracted staff.

All of CIWT's learning sites operate under one of four "schoolhouse commands, each which specializes in a different concentration. Each schoolhouse has its own leadership team (CO/XO/CMC) and operates independently of one another. 

Information Warfare Training Command Corry Station focuses on cryptologic technician (CTT/CTR/CTI/CTM/CTN) and information systems technician enlisted "A" and "C" schools and cryptologic warfare and information professional officer courses.
Information Warfare Training Site Keesler - Spectrum Operations Apprentice Course and the Joint Task Force Spectrum Management Course
Information Warfare Training Command Monterey specializes in training language training for Navy linguists, the special warfare community, Personnel Exchange Program, and foreign area officers through Defense Language Institute, Presidio of Monterey, California
Information Warfare Training Site Medina
Information Warfare Training Site Fort Meade
Information Warfare Training Command San Diego 
Information Warfare Training Site Hawaii
Information Warfare Training Site Pacific Northwest 
Information Warfare Training Site Yokosuka 
Information Warfare Training Command Virginia Beach
Information Warfare Training Site Groton - information technology (submarine) "A" school
Information Warfare Training Site Jacksonville - electronic warfare & some afloat cryptologic training
Information Warfare Training Site Kings Bay - advanced electronic systems courses (FT/IT/ET ratings)
Information Warfare Training Site Mayport - advanced network system management
In addition, there are two CIWT sites that are not under another schoolhouse, and report directly to CIWT: CIWT Detachment Goodfellow at Goodfellow Air Force Base and CIWT Detachment at Fort Gordon, Georgia.

The Center had previously been called the Center for Information Dominance; its name was changed in 2016.

References

Attribution

External links

Buildings and structures in Escambia County, Florida
Military installations in Florida
United States Navy installations